In enzymology, a succinate-citramalate CoA-transferase is an enzyme that catalyzes the chemical reaction

succinyl-CoA + citramalate  succinate + citramalyl-CoA

Thus, the two substrates of this enzyme are succinyl-CoA and citramalate, whereas its two products are succinate and citramalyl-CoA.

This enzyme belongs to the family of transferases, specifically the CoA-transferases.  The systematic name of this enzyme class is succinyl-CoA:citramalate CoA-transferase. Other names in common use include itaconate CoA-transferase, citramalate CoA-transferase, citramalate coenzyme A-transferase, and succinyl coenzyme A-citramalyl coenzyme A transferase.  This enzyme participates in c5-branched dibasic acid metabolism.

References

 

EC 2.8.3
Enzymes of unknown structure